Ma Zhaoxu (also spelled as Ma Chao-hsü; ; born 1 September 1963) is a Chinese diplomat who is currently the Deputy Minister of Foreign Affairs and also concurrently serving as Vice Minister of Foreign Affairs.

He previously served as the Chinese Ambassador to Australia, the spokesman for the Ministry of Foreign Affairs of the People's Republic of China (PRC), as well as the director-general of its Information Department. He also served as China's Permanent Representative to the United Nations (UN) in New York City from January 2018 to July 2019.

Early life
Ma Zhaoxu was born in Harbin, Heilongjiang province in September 1963. He graduated from Peking University with a degree in international relations. In 1986, he participated in the inaugural Asian college students debating competition organized by the Singapore Broadcasting Corporation (SBC) and won the "best debater" award, becoming well known to PRC college students at the time.

Career 
Ma joined the Foreign Affairs Ministry in 1987 and served in various departments and embassies, including counselor at the PRC embassy in the United Kingdom from 2001 to 2002 and counselor at the PRC embassy in Belgium from 2002 to 2004. He was appointed deputy director of the Policy Planning Department in 2004 and director in 2006. In January 2009, he replaced Liu Jianchao as the director-general of the Information Department as well as the head spokesperson of the ministry.

In April 2010, as spokesman of the Foreign Affairs Ministry, Ma stated that “there are no dissidents in China”, while China responds disapprovingly to the Nobel prize having been awarded to incarcerated Chinese dissident Liu Xiaobo.

On 6 April 2016, he was appointed as the Permanent Representative of the People's Republic of China to the United Nations Office at Geneva (UNOG) and other International Organizations.

In 2018, Ma succeeded Liu Jieyi as China's Permanent Representative to the UN in New York.

Ma was appointed Vice Minister of Foreign Affairs on July 15, 2019. As vice minister, he is responsible for managing international organizations and conferences, international economy and arms control affairs.

On 13 January 2023, Ma was further promoted to Deputy Minister of Foreign Affairs taking charge of all daily working affairs. This position is equivalent to a ministerial-level rank.

Personal life
Ma is married with one daughter and one grandchild. His daughter was a student at Carnegie Mellon University and George Washington University.

See also
 Chinese in New York City

References

External links
 Foreign Affairs Ministry spokesman Ma Zhaoxu's biography (Ministry of Foreign Affairs of PRC).

1963 births
Living people
Chinese Communist Party politicians from Heilongjiang
People's Republic of China politicians from Heilongjiang
Ambassadors of China to Australia
Peking University alumni
Alumni of the London School of Economics
Permanent Representatives of the People's Republic of China to the United Nations
Diplomats of the People's Republic of China